Fever Tree is a  former American psychedelic rock band of the 1960s, chiefly known for their anthemic 1968 hit, "San Francisco Girls (Return of the Native)".

History
The group originated in Houston, Texas and began in 1966 as a folk rock group called The Bostwick Vines. They changed their name to Fever Tree a year later after the addition of keyboard player Rob Landes.

The band briefly entered the public consciousness when their song "San Francisco Girls (Return of the Native)" reached No. 91 in the U.S. on the Billboard Hot 100 chart in June 1968. Like most of the band's material, it was written by the couple of Scott and Vivian Holtzman, who also were their producers. This four-minute track captured all the band's trademarks: Dennis Keller's incantation-like vocals, the quick shifting between slow parts with an almost sacral feeling and faster, more rock-oriented parts, and especially the searing guitar work by Michael Knust.

Fever Tree also released their self-titled debut album, Fever Tree, in 1968, which charted at No. 156 on the Billboard 200 Chart. A second album, Another Time,  Another Place, followed in 1969 and peaked at No. 83 with a third album Creation, charting at No. 97 on the Billboard 200 Chart in 1970. After "San Francisco Girls", they never had another hit, although they later also tried writing songs themselves when they had dropped the Holtzmans as producers. The group disbanded in 1970, but reformed in 1978 with only guitarist Michael Knust remaining from the original line-up. The new formation of the group had little commercial success; Fever Tree was not heard of again until 2003 when Michael Knust died.

Fever Tree's first two albums (Fever Tree and Another Time, Another Place) were re-released as a single CD on October 31, 2006. Fever Tree's third and fourth albums (Creation and For Sale) are also available as a single CD.

Their recording of "Ninety-Nine and a Half (Won't Do)" by Steve Cropper, Eddie Floyd, and Wilson Pickett was sampled as the primary riff in Madvillain's "America's Most Blunted" from their 2004 self-titled debut.

Band members
Dennis Keller - vocals
Michael Stephen Knust (March 11, 1949 - September 15, 2003) - guitar
Rob Landes - synthesizer, organ, piano
E.E. "Bud" Wolfe - bass guitar
John Tuttle - drums
Don Lampton - guitar, keyboards

Discography
Albums
Fever Tree (1968), Uni Records/MCA US Billboard #156
Another Time, Another Place (1968), Uni/MCA US Billboard #83 Tracks:  A1 Man Who Paints the Pictures - Part 2  A2 What Time Did You Say It Is In Salt Lake City?  A3 Don't Come Crying To Me Girl  A4 Fever  A5 Grand Candy Young Sweet  B1 Jokes Are For Sad People  B2 I've Never Seen Evergreen  B3 Peace of Mind  B4 Death Is The Dancer
Creation (1969), Uni/MCA US Billboard #97
For Sale (1970),  Ampex Records
Live at Lake Charles (1978), Shroom Records

Singles 
 "Girl Oh Girl (Don't Push Me)" / "Steve Lenore" (1967) US Record World #140
 "Hey Mister" / "I Can Beat Your Drum" (1968)
"Girl, Oh Girl"  / "Steve Lenore" (1968)
"San Francisco Girls (Return of the Native)" / "Come with Me" (1968) US Billboard #91
"What Time Did You Say It Is in Salt Lake City?" / "Where Did You Go" (1968) US Cash Box #105

References

External links
Interview with Michael Knust
German tribute site
Rob Landes, Organist and Artist-in-Residence
Rob Landes and the Rob Landes Trio

Musical groups from Houston
Psychedelic rock music groups from Texas
Uni Records artists